Cubophis is a genus of snakes in the family Colubridae. They are found in the northwestern Caribbean.

Species
The following six species are recognized as being valid.
Cubophis brooksi (Barbour, 1914) - Little Swan Island, Honduras - Swan Island racer
Cubophis cantherigerus (Bibron, 1843) - Cuba, Bahamas (Cay Sal Bank) - Cuban racer
Cubophis caymanus (Garman, 1887) - Grand Cayman, Cayman Islands - Grand Cayman racer
Cubophis fuscicauda (Garman, 1888) - Cayman Islands - Cayman Brac racer
Cubophis ruttyi (Grant, 1941) - Cayman Islands - Little Cayman racer
Cubophis vudii (Cope, 1862) - Bahamas - Bahamian racer

References

Further reading
Hedges SB, Couloux A, Vidal N (2009). "Molecular phylogeny, classification, and biogeography of West Indian racer snakes of the Tribe Alsophiini (Squamata, Dipsadidae, Xenodontinae)". Zootaxa 2067: 1–28. (Cubophis, new genus, p. 14).

Snake genera
Cubophis
Taxa named by Stephen Blair Hedges
Snakes of the Caribbean